There are several tourist attractions in Nigeria, each with its own uniqueness, nature, structure and historical background.

This is a list of notable tourist attractions in Nigeria, arranged in alphabetical order.

 Agbokim Waterfalls 
 Agodi Gardens
 Aso Rock

Bar Beach, Lagos
Benue River
Biu Plateau
Bina Footprint

Chad Basin
Cross River National Park

Emotan Statue
Erin-Ijesha Waterfalls

 Ezeagu waterfalls 

Gashaka Gumti National Park
Gurara Waterfalls

Ibeno Beach
Idanre Hill
Ikogosi Warm Springs
Isaac Boro Park

Kainji Dam
Kainji National Park
Kamuku National Park

Lake Chad

Mambilla Plateau
Mandara Mountains
Millennium Park (Abuja)
Mount Patti

National Arts Theatre
National War Museum, Umuahia
National Stadium Abuja
New Afrika Shrine
Ngwo Pine forest
Niger River

Oban Hills
Obudu Cattle Ranch
Obudu Plateau
Ogbunike Caves

Okomu Forest Reserve
Okomu National Park
Old Oyo National Park
Olumo Rock
Oron Museum
Osun-Osogbo

Port Harcourt Tourist Beach

Queen Amina Statue
Sir Lugard Empire Hill

Sukur Cultural Landscape

Tinapa Resort

Yankari National Park

Zuma Rock

References